The 2004 Les Saintes earthquake occurred at  on November 21, 2004 with a moment magnitude of 6.3 and maximum European macroseismic intensity of VIII (Heavily damaging). The shock was named for Îles des Saintes "Island of the Saints", a group of small islands to the south of Guadeloupe, which is an overseas department of France. Although it occurred near the Lesser Antilles subduction zone, this was an intraplate, normal fault event. It resulted in one death, 13 injuries, and 40 people being made homeless, but the overall damage was considered moderate. A small, nondestructive tsunami was reported, but run-up and inundation distances were difficult to measure due to a storm that occurred on the day of the event. Unusual effects at a volcanic lake on Dominica were also documented, and an aftershock caused additional damage three months later.

Tectonic setting

While the northern and southern boundaries of the Caribbean Plate are complex and diffuse, with zones of seismicity stretching several hundred kilometers across, the eastern boundary is that of the Lesser Antilles subduction zone. The largest known earthquake on the plate interface was a M7.5–8.0 event in 1843, but it did not generate a large tsunami. In opposition, the three largest events between 1950 and 1978 were intraplate normal faulting events.

Earthquake

Late 1990s bathymetric studies showed that it had vertical fault scarps approaching . The type of slip was primarily extensional, but included a small amount of left-lateral slip, and may have contributed to hydrological/volcanic effects that were observed on the island of Dominica, where a flooded fumarole drained twice.

Damage
A maximum intensity of VIII (Heavily damaging) on the European macroseismic scale was recorded at Terre-de-Haut, where some serious damage occurred to a school, a church, and some homes near the sugar loaf. The same intensity was observed at Terre-de-Bas, where damage was moderate and non-structural in nature. At Petite-Anse, a small area contained some damaged walls, but no complete collapses occurred. At Grand-Bourg on the island of Marie-Galante (where the intensity was deemed to be VI–VII (Slightly damaging–Damaging)) the town hall, a church, and a college were red-tagged (unsuitable for use). The same intensity was assigned to the nearby commune of Saint-Louis, where the newly built town hall had visible cracks and the church was closed due to the potential of aftershocks breaking stained glass windows.

Boiling Lake

In the weeks following the mainshock, no abnormal geochemical or seismic activity was observed at La Grande Soufrière (an active stratovolcano) on Guadeloupe, but on southern Dominica near the Valley of Desolation, a flooded fumarole known as Boiling Lake was discovered empty by tourists on Christmas Day. By mid-February, the lake was full again, but its temperature had not returned to normal. The water level dropped again following the M5.8 aftershock on February 14.

Aftershocks
By mid-February, aftershock activity had essentially ceased, with events becoming increasingly far apart. On February 14, a strong and slightly-damaging aftershock occurred. The damage was minimal, with cracks developing on the roads, some broken water pipes, and wall and roof damage—including at some locations that were damaged during the mainshock.

Tsunami
A small tsunami took place following the shock, and while no tide gauges captured the event, scientists were on scene several days later to investigate. Investigators documented a  run-up at Anse Pajot, but these findings were difficult to distinguish from the storm surge.

See also
Geography of Dominica
Lesser Antilles
List of earthquakes in 2004
List of earthquakes in the Caribbean

References

External links
M6.3 - Dominica region, Leeward Islands – United States Geological Survey

2004 earthquakes
2004 tsunamis
2004 in the Caribbean
2004 in Guadeloupe
November 2004 events in North America
Earthquakes in Guadeloupe
Earthquakes in Dominica